Gensac-de-Boulogne (literally Gensac of Boulogne) is a commune in the Haute-Garonne department in southwestern France.

Geography
The river Gesse forms part of the commune's eastern border; the Gimone forms part of its western border.

Population

See also
Communes of the Haute-Garonne department

References

Communes of Haute-Garonne
Comminges